The Atomic Bomb Casualty Commission (ABCC) (Japanese:原爆傷害調査委員会, Genbakushōgaichōsaiinkai) was a commission established in 1946 in accordance with a presidential directive from Harry S. Truman to the National Academy of Sciences-National Research Council to conduct investigations of the late effects of radiation among the atomic-bomb survivors in Hiroshima and Nagasaki. As it was erected purely for scientific research and study, not as a provider of medical care and also because it was heavily supported by the United States, the ABCC was generally mistrusted by most survivors and Japanese alike. It operated for nearly thirty years before its dissolution in 1975.

History
The Atomic Bomb Casualty Commission (ABCC) was formed after the United States attack on Hiroshima and Nagasaki on August 6 and August 9, 1945. The ABCC originally began as the Joint Commission  The ABCC set out to obtain first-hand technical information and make a report to let people know the opportunities for a long-term study of atomic bomb casualties.  In 1946, Lewis Weed, head of the National Research Council, called together a group of scientists who agreed that a "detailed and long-range study of the biological and medical effects upon the human being" was "of the utmost importance to the United States and mankind in general." President Harry S. Truman ordered the ABCC into existence on November 26, 1946. The key members in the ABCC were Lewis Weed, National Research Council physicians Austin M. Brues and Paul Henshaw, and Army representatives Melvin A. Block, and James V. Neel who was also an MD with a Ph.D. in genetics.
The fifth person on the team was USNV Ltd. Jg Fredrick Ullrich of Naval Medical Research Center  appointed by the National Research Council at the suggestion of the Surgeon General's Office.

The Atomic Bomb Casualty Commission's Work
The ABCC arrived in Japan on November 24, 1946, and familiarized themselves with the procedures of the Japanese military.  They visited Hiroshima and Nagasaki to see what work was being done. They found that the Japanese had a well-organized medical group under the Japanese National Research Council, who were carrying out studies on both immediate and delayed atomic bomb damage in survivors. It’s almost impossible to get an exact figure of how many people were killed in the two bombings, because both cities had people who had evacuated since it was a time of war. Hiroshima expected bombings, since they were an important military supply center, so many people had left the area. There were also people from surrounding areas who would come into the city on an irregular basis to serve in work crews. Robert Holmes, who was director of the ABCC from 1954-1957, said that "[the survivors] are the most important people living"

The ABCC also drew on the work of Chinese scientists, who were already studying the survivors in the time before the ABCC arrived in Japan, so there was information from both American and Chinese officials. Masao Tsuzuki was the leading Japanese authority on the biological effects of radiation. He said there were four causes of injury in the bombed cities: heat, blast, primary radiation and radioactive poisonous gas. In a report that was released by Tsuzuki, he answered the question, "What does strong radioactive energy do to the human body?" His answer was, "damage to blood, then hematopoietic organs such as bone marrow, spleen, and lymph nodes.  All are destroyed or damaged severely. Lungs, intestines, liver, kidney etc are affected and their functions disturbed as a result." The damages were rated by severity. People suffering from severe damage were people who were in within a 1 km radius of the hypocenter. The severely affected people typically died within a few days, some living as long as two weeks. Moderate damage was seen in people living in a 1–2 km. radius from the hypocenter, and those people would live for 2–6 weeks. Those people living within a 2–4 km. radius had slight damage, and which would not cause death, but would cause some health problems during the several months after the exposure.

The ABCC grows
The ABCC grew rapidly in 1948 and 1949. Their staff numbers quadrupled in just one year. By 1951 the total stood at 1063 employees – 143 allied and 920 Japanese personnel. Perhaps the most important research undertaken by the ABCC was the genetics study, which focused its study on the uncertainties surrounding the possible long-term effects of ionizing radiation in pregnant women and their unborn children. The study did not find evidence of widespread genetic damage. It did, however, find increased incidence of microcephaly and mental retardation in children most proximally exposed in utero to the bombs' radiation. The genetics project studied the effects of radiation on the survivors and their children. This project turned out to be the largest and most interactive of the ABCC programs. In 1957, Japan passed the Atomic Bomb Survivors Relief Law, which qualified certain people for two medical exams per year. The Japanese term for the survivors of the atomic bombs is hibakusha. The qualifications for medical care were those within a few kilometers of the hypocenters at the time of the bombings; those within 2 kilometers of the hypocenters within two weeks of the bombings; those exposed to radiation from fallout and children who were in utero by women who fit into any of the other categories.

Pros and cons of the ABCC
There were pros and cons to the ABCC. The cons: they overlooked Japanese needs in small details. The flooring in the waiting room for mothers and babies was polished linoleum, and women in their wooden clogs would often slip and fall. The signs and magazines in the waiting rooms were in English. The ABCC did not actually treat the survivors they studied, they just studied them over periods of time. They had them come for examination during weekday working hours, causing the person to lose a day of pay, and they offered little compensation to the survivors.

The pros: they provided people with valuable medical information. Infants received a check up at birth and again at 9 months, which was not common at the time. Medical check ups on healthy infants were unheard of. Adults also benefited from frequent medical examinations.

ABCC becomes the RERF

In 1951, the Atomic Energy Commission (AEC) was planning on stopping funding for the ABCC's work in Japan. However, James V. Neel made an appeal and the AEC decided to fund them $20,000 a year, for three years, to continue research. In 1956, Neel and William J. Schull published their final draft of The Effect of Exposure to the Atomic Bombs on Pregnancy Termination in Hiroshima and Nagasaki. This monograph gave a detailed description of all the data they had collected Despite their efforts, trust in the ABCC was declining, so the ABCC became the Radiation Effects Research Foundation (RERF), and with the new name and administrative organization, funding for the research on survivors was to be provided equally by the United States and Japan. The RERF was established on 1 April 1975. A binational organization run by both the United States and Japan, the RERF is still in operation today.

Further reading
 The Atomic Bomb Casualty Commission in retrospect, PNAS, by Frank W. Putnam.
M. Susan Lindee (1994). Suffering Made Real: American Science and the Survivors at Hiroshima. University Of Chicago Press. .
Sue Rabbitt Roff (1995). Hotspots: The Legacy of Hiroshima and Nagasaki. Cassell. .
White Light/Black Rain: The Destruction of Hiroshima and Nagasaki (2007)
G.W.Beebe (1979). Reflections on the work of the Atomic Bomb Casualty Commission in Japan

References

M. Susan Lindee (1994). Suffering Made Real: American Science and the Survivors at Hiroshima. University Of Chicago Press. .
Objectives and History. Radiation Effects Research Foundation. 2007. Rerf.or.jp. 21 Apr. 2008. https://web.archive.org/web/20090201054641/http://rerf.or.jp/intro/establish/index_e.html.
Paul S. Henshaw & Austin M. Brues. Atomic Bomb Casualty Commission: General Report. Jan 1947. http://www7.nationalacademies.org/archives/ABCC_GeneralReport1947.html .
Tsuzuki, Masao. Appendix No. 9: Report on the Medical Studies of the Effects of the Atomic Bomb. http://www7.nationalacademies.org/archives/ABCC_GeneralReport1947.html .

External links
White Light/Black Rain Official Website  (film)
 ABCC Collection at John P. McGovern Historical Collections and Research Center (Houston Academy of Medicine-Texas Medical Center Library).
Radiation Effects Research Foundation Home website in English and Japanese
Albert W. Hilberg Atomic Bomb Casualty Commission collection (University of Maryland Libraries)

Atomic bombings of Hiroshima and Nagasaki
Radiation health effects research
1946 establishments in the United States
1975 disestablishments in the United States